WAL or Wal may refer to:

Places
 Wał, Lublin Voivodeship, village in eastern Poland
 Wał, Masovian Voivodeship, village in east-central Poland
 Wales, constituent nation of the United Kingdom
 Wallonia, Walloon Region of Belgium
 Wallops Flight Facility (IATA: WAL), Virginia, USA

People

Given named
 Wal (given name)
 Niels Wal Hansen (1892–1973), Dutch sailer

Surnamed
 Peter Chol Wal, South Sudanese politician
 Priya Wal (born 1985), Indian actress
 Van der Wal (surname), a Dutch surname which can also be derived as Wal

Fictional characters
 Wallace Cadwallader "Wal" Footrot, the main character in the Footrot Flats comic strip
 Wal Rus, a Marvel Comics character, a fictional anthropomorphic walrus

Brands, groups, organizations, enterprises
 Wal (bass), a brand of electric bass guitars, founded by Ian Waller and Pete Stevens
 Wal-Mart Stores, a multi-national retailer founded by Sam Walton
 World Atlantic Airlines (ICAO: WAL), an airline based in Miami, Florida, USA

Technology
 Wide-angle lens, photographic equipment
 Write-ahead logging, a database management technique

Other uses
 Wolaitta language (ISO 639: wal)
 Dornier Do J Wal ("whale"), a German flying boat of the 1920s
 Weighted-average life, in loan repayment timing

See also

 Dornier Do R Super Wal (superwhale), a German flying boat airliner
 
 
 Wall (disambiguation)
 Walle (name)